Santa Apolonia and Santa Apolónia are the Spanish and Portuguese spellings of Saint Apollonia.

It is also used as a place name:
Santa Apolonia, Chimaltenango, Guatemala
Santa Apolonia, Matanzas, Cuba
, Peru
Santa Apolónia Station, a major railway and metro station in Lisbon, Portugal
Santa Apolonia, Trujillo, Venezuela
A former name of Réunion Island given by Portuguese Explorers in the 16th Century, now part of France